CKM NSS School is a Central Board of Secondary Education school located in Chalakudy in the state of Kerala, India, 30 km from Trichur and 40 km to Cochin.

References

1980 establishments in Kerala
Education in Chalakudy
Educational institutions established in 1980
Schools in Thrissur district